John Micael Downs (December 17, 1936 – October 21, 2019) was an American sketch artist, who worked for the Chicago Daily News and Chicago Sun-Times.

Early life and education 
He was born in Tomah, Wisconsin.

He studied at the School of the Art Institute.

Career 
He worked as an illustrator while serving in the United States Army.  He later contributed nearly 150 illustrations in an Air Force arts program.

As a sketch artist, he worked for the Chicago Daily News and Chicago Sun-Times and covered many famous trials including that of the Chicago Seven trial.

References 

American male artists
1936 births
2019 deaths
Artists from Chicago
School of the Art Institute of Chicago alumni
20th-century American artists
21st-century American artists
Chicago Daily News people
Chicago Sun-Times people
People from Tomah, Wisconsin
Artists from Wisconsin
Military personnel from Wisconsin
Courtroom sketch artists
20th-century American male artists